Laniipriva is a monotypic moth genus of the family Crambidae described by Eugene G. Munroe in 1976. It contains only one species, Laniipriva antobliqua, described by the same author in the same year, which is found in Venezuela.

References

Spilomelinae
Taxa named by Eugene G. Munroe
Crambidae genera
Monotypic moth genera